is a passenger railway station located in the city of Kōka, Shiga Prefecture, Japan, operated by the West Japan Railway Company (JR West).

Lines

Station layout
The station consists of two opposed side platforms connected by an elevated station building. The station is staffed.

Platforms

History
The station became Kōka Station on April 10, 1956. The station became part of the West Japan Railway Company on April 1, 1987 due to the privatization and dissolution of the JNR.

Passenger statistics
In fiscal 2019, the station was used by an average of 855 passengers daily (boarding passengers only).

Surrounding area
 Koka City Koga Junior High School
 Koka Central Park
 Koga no Sato Ninja Village

See also
List of railway stations in Japan

References

External links

JR West official home page

Railway stations in Shiga Prefecture
Railway stations in Japan opened in 1904
Kōka, Shiga